Kamel Djabour (born 12 June 1959) is a French football coach and former player.

Early and personal life
Djabour was born in Paris on 12 June 1959. He is of Algerian origin.

Playing career
Djabour played as a defender for Le Blanc-Mesnil.

Coaching career
Djabour has worked with clubs in Benin with Dynamo Abomey and Mali with Stade Malien. He left his position as assistant manager of French club Auxerre to become manager of the Congo national team. He managed Algerian side JSM Béjaïa between October 2013 and February 2014.

References

1959 births
Living people
French sportspeople of Algerian descent
Footballers from Paris
French footballers
Association football defenders
French football managers
Racing Club de France Football managers
Entente SSG managers
Dynamo Abomey FC managers
Tonnerre d'Abomey FC managers
Congo national football team managers
JSM Béjaïa managers
Stade Malien managers
Al-Ittihad Kalba SC managers
Al Jahra SC managers
French expatriate football managers
French expatriate sportspeople in Benin
Expatriate football managers in Benin
French expatriate sportspeople in the Republic of the Congo
Expatriate football managers in the Republic of the Congo
French expatriate sportspeople in Mali
Expatriate football managers in Mali
French expatriate sportspeople in Algeria
Expatriate football managers in Algeria
French expatriate sportspeople in the United Arab Emirates
Expatriate football managers in the United Arab Emirates
French expatriate sportspeople in Kuwait
Expatriate football managers in Kuwait